Coluzea juliae is a species of large sea snail, marine gastropod mollusk in the family Columbariidae.

Description

Distribution

References

External links

Columbariidae
Gastropods described in 1989